Bill Wurtz (stylized in lower case as bill wurtz or billwurtz) is an American musician, singer-songwriter, animator, video editor, and internet personality based in New York City. He is known for his distinctive musical, comedic, and narrative style which includes deadpan delivery and singing paired with colorful surrealist, psychedelic, and non-sequitur graphics.

Wurtz first published material on YouTube in 2013. He set up a website in 2014, presenting a catalog of music and videos he had created since 2002. Wurtz proceeded to upload edited versions of his videos on Vine, where he gained his initial popularity. He experienced breakout success on YouTube with his animated videos, History of Japan (2016), and History of the Entire World, I Guess (2017). Wurtz released music videos regularly from 2017 to March 2019. Through the rest of 2019 and all of 2020, Wurtz was inactive on YouTube, returning to the platform in January 2021 with a new visual style of 3D animation.

Career

Pre-Vine years 
Wurtz's first recorded composition was an instrumental named "Late Nite Lounge with Loud Lenny" which according to his site was recorded on June 17, 2002, his first recorded song was "stuck in a rut" recorded on March 3, 2005.

Wurtz used to go by Billy Wilds in 2009, but later found out that it's the same name as a male pornstar.

Wurtz's first known YouTube activity were on an account called "billynothingshow".

Vine videos 
Wurtz was first known for his presence on the short-form video-sharing website Vine, where he first gained a following in 2014. He began by taking short videos he had previously published to his website and re-editing them to fit Vine's six-second restriction. Before transitioning fully to YouTube, Wurtz was uploading a video to Vine nearly every day. He received early attention in 2015 for the short video "Shaving My Piano", which was covered briefly in The Verge. On April 11, 2016, Wurtz won the Shorty Award for "Tech & Innovation: Weird" at the 8th Shorty Awards; during the awards ceremony, attention was given to one of his Vine uploads "I'm Still a Piece of Garbage". Wurtz withdrew from making vines to focus on finishing History of Japan.

YouTube

History of Japan 
Wurtz had originally intended to make a video on US history, but abandoned it.

Alongside interest on Vine, Wurtz achieved wider popularity in 2016 with History of Japan, a nine-minute YouTube video that outlines Japan's history. Wurtz chose the topic due to his lack of knowledge of it. The video covers key events of its history: "Buddhism, internal conflict, alliances with Britain, World War I, World War II, the dropping of atomic bombs and its post-war economic miracle". It showcases Wurtz's quirky visual and comedic style through a mixture of fast-paced narration and animation, intercut with short musical jingles. The video was described as "an entertaining new approach to education". It went viral on social media after its release on February 2, 2016, and under a week later, received over four million views by February 8. It particularly received considerable attention on Tumblr and Reddit. As of August 2021, the video has over 68 million views. German Lopez of Vox called it a "strange", "pretty good – and surprisingly funny" video. Lopez noted the poor coverage of Japanese war crimes committed against Korea and China in the 20th century, particularly the Nanjing Massacre and the use of Korean sex slaves, and attributed this omission to the video's short runtime. On his questions page, Wurtz responded by suggesting to viewers to look for other channels.

History of the Entire World, I Guess 

Wurtz released a 20-minute overview of world history, History of the Entire World, I Guess, on May 10, 2017. The video took over 11 months to produce, including almost 3 months of research – it briefly covers the topics of natural history and human civilization spanning from the Big Bang to the near future. The video marked the continued development of Wurtz's cinematic style, with fast-paced, absurdist humor and jazz-like musical interludes.

History of the Entire World, I Guess was the top video on the YouTube trending page on the day of its release, receiving 3.2 million views on its first day, and on Reddit it became the most upvoted YouTube link of all time. It became an Internet meme and was listed at eighth place on YouTube's list of the top 10 trending videos of the year. As of January 2023, it has over 152 million views. Writer German Lopez for the news website Vox praised the video for not heavily focusing on western and US history, and successfully covering other areas in world history which may be neglected in US schools, such as powers in China, Persia, and India. Because it resists specialization and assembles history in chronological order starting from the beginning of the Universe, history of the entire world, i guess can be considered a work of Big History, and is probably one of the most popular works associated with the discipline. It has been called a "must-see" and is considered to be Wurtz's magnum opus. In 2020, Thrillist ranked the video at number 40 on its list of best YouTube videos of all time.

Music 
Wurtz's song "Just Did a Bad Thing" and the accompanying video spawned TikTok videos of people lip-syncing to the opening lines; in the platform, #ididabadthing became the top hashtag of March 2019. Following this, Wurtz would only post four more videos before his break, ending with "Might Quit". After "Might Quit" was released, Wurtz would not post any new videos to YouTube for nearly two years, before continuing to release music and videos animated in 3D with Blender.

Style 
Wurtz has developed an absurdist, surreal style on both his music and animation. Eddie Kim wrote for MEL Magazine that Wurtz "refuses to mimic anyone else's animation or musical style, but it's not weird for weirdness' sake alone", comparing him to Thundercat and Louis Cole and highlighting Wurtz's pretty pop melodies, unexpected chords and multi-layered rhythms as commonalities. Geoff Carter of Las Vegas Weekly stated: "Merge Don Hertzfeldt, Jenny Holzer and Thundercat and you might get someone a little bit like Bill Wurtz". Nick Douglas of Lifehacker summarized him as "somewhere between comedy and education and vaporwave."

Music 
Wurtz's music has been classified as jazz-pop, incorporating elements of lo-fi music, smooth jazz, funk and easy listening. Wurtz tends to reject genre categorization, and does not consider himself to be a jazz musician. Overall, his music evokes malaise, self-deprecation, and a "blurring of the lines between irony, parody and honesty". This is often paired comedically with dire circumstances or sobering undertones. In an interview with Genius, Wurtz stated that "it's a good... songwriting technique to write about something bad with a good sounding melody, because if you can get people to feel good about something bad, then you're bulletproof in life." Wurtz's voice has been described as "silky tenor with range and energy". Artists who have expressed admiration for Wurtz's music include indie musicians Daði Freyr and Sidney Gish, fellow YouTube musician Adam Neely, DJ and producer Porter Robinson, as well as Australian singer Sia.

Wurtz started playing music at a very early age. He has claimed to be "wholly self-taught" as a musician, and regularly downplays the importance of music theory in songwriting and composition, insisting that the sound and feel of music should be prioritized over attempts to conform to theory. In fact, one of the defining characteristics of Wurtz's style is a subversion to conventional approaches to composition. One example is "I Wanna Be a Movie Star", highlighted in an article for the student newspaper The Harbinger, where the author praised Wurtz's skill in incorporating complex time signatures without causing the music to feel "either incomplete or too long", instead achieving a sound that "feel[s] completely natural" and "pop-ish".

Wurtz has used different programs to edit his music, including GarageBand from 2009 to 2010, and long-discontinued Logic Express 9 until at least 2016.

Videos 
Wurtz's videos are typically in a lo-fi, neon aesthetic, and have been described as surreal and psychedelic. They range from "nonsensical" shorts to animated music videos, and often involve deadpan humor, dancing stick figures, vaporwave-like transitions and neon, sans-serif text on-screen. Wurtz often follows similar patterns in his videos such as multi-layering, and clip art images. He has stated the low-budget quality arose out of a necessity to publish videos regularly and evolved naturally.

At Vidcon 2018, Wurtz was asked why his style is so different from other YouTube musicians. He stated that he chooses to "live under a rock" and produce his music in isolation rather than take inspiration from other creators on the platform. Wurtz publicly struggles with perfectionism, making use of schedules and deadlines to overcome it. In response to a fan question he explained that in the process of doing this he has "been forced to become an expert on carelessness".

Wurtz is decidedly against running advertising on or accepting sponsorships for his videos, despite admitting an "enormous" pressure to do so. He has explained that advertisements make him "uncomfortable" and that he thinks they "suck". As a result, all of Wurtz's videos and music are available for free on his website. Wurtz does receive direct fan support, which includes crowdfunding on Patreon, streams on music streaming services, and merchandise sales, but does not heavily promote any of these revenue streams.

From his first video up until early 2019, Wurtz used Final Cut Express 4, a program that was discontinued as far back as in 2011. In 2019, he switched to Final Cut Pro X. Wurtz also taught himself the 3D animation software Blender, which enabled him to create significantly more complex and realistic graphics for his videos.

Website 
Wurtz launched his personal website billwurtz.com in 2014. Despite this, it has been compared to a late 1990s website due to its simple design. Apart from containing all of his released songs and most of his videos dating back since 2002, the website also features many other types of content not available elsewhere. For example, Wurtz posts vlog-style 'reality' videos depicting his creative process. Wurtz maintains a section on his website to answer anonymously submitted questions. His answers to questions are considered an aspect of Wurtz's creative output; the style of his answers have been described as "verging on the poetic" and "earnest, if somewhat loopy-sounding". One such answer, highlighted by the website Ok Whatever, addresses a question concerning Wurtz's personality:

Awards

Discography 
From 2009 to 2014, Wurtz self-released his music on Bandcamp. Since then, he has eschewed the album format, though he has stated that this is due to his disliking of the format.

Albums 
 What the Fuck (2010)
 Church Sessions (2010)
 The Summertime (2010)
 Fun Music (2011)

EPs 
 Yikes (2009)
 The Song Song (2009)
 Guerilla Myspace Project (2009)
 Bach Garageband (2010)
 Burger King Spring (2010)
 April Flowers (2010)
 It's All About the Ladies (2010)
 Fly July (2010)
 Short Butt Suites (2010)
 Fall Sprawl (2010)
 Murder Your Demon (2011)
 When is it Time to Come Home Again? (2011)
 Soap Boat (2011)
 Love (2011)
 Pain (2011)
 Hi-Bye (New Shorts) (2013)
 New School (2014)
 We Could Just Get Right (2014)
 Eat Dirt Shorts (2014)
 My Next Album (2014)
 High Enough (2014)

Music videos 
Since March 2014, Wurtz has published numerous full-length music videos, following the same format as his shorter videos. He has made them available on his YouTube channel:

Other songs 
Wurtz has published many other full-length songs not accompanied by music videos. They are all available on his website, and some are also available on streaming services. Songs include:

2009

2010

2011

2014

2017

Furthermore, Wurtz has published a myriad of shorter songs or jingles on his website ranging from a couple of seconds to up to a minute in length.

Notes

References

Bill Wurtz's questions page

Other sources

External links 
 

21st-century American musicians
American indie pop musicians
American male singer-songwriters
American male jazz musicians
American multi-instrumentalists
American YouTubers
Comedy YouTubers
Internet memes
Jazz-pop musicians
Living people
Music YouTubers
Musicians from New York City
Surreal comedy
Video bloggers
Vine (service) celebrities
YouTube animators
YouTube channels launched in 2012
Shorty Award winners
21st-century American male singers
21st-century American singers
Jazz musicians from New York (state)
Singer-songwriters from New York (state)
21st-century multi-instrumentalists
Year of birth missing (living people)